Greylake is a 9.3 hectare geological Site of Special Scientific Interest near Middlezoy in Somerset, notified in 1987.

This site, on the Somerset Levels, consists of 20 low-lying fields in the north west corner of King's Sedgemoor, and includes the Royal Society for the Protection of Birds Greylake nature reserve which has taken over arable farmland and is now home to northern lapwings, common snipe, Eurasian curlews, redshanks, yellow wagtails, skylarks, and meadow pipits.

This location is the type section for the Pleistocene Burtle Beds, as it is probably the most complete Burtle Beds
sequence in Somerset. It demonstrates a sequence of fluvial (or possibly glacial) gravels, marine intertidal silts and marine subtidal. Rich molluscan, ostracod, and foraminifera assemblages and a mammalian fauna, including red deer (Cervus elephus), aurochs (Bos primigenius), and fallow deer (Dama dama) have been recorded.

Greylake was flooded during the winter flooding of 2013–14 on the Somerset Levels.

References

External links
 English Nature website (SSSI information)

Sites of Special Scientific Interest in Somerset
Sites of Special Scientific Interest notified in 1987
Geology of Somerset